This Is the Life I Lead is the third solo studio album by American rapper and record producer Daz Dillinger. It was released on June 11, 2002 via D.P.G. Recordz. Production was handled by Mike Dean and Daz himself, who also served as executive producer. It features guest appearances from Tanya Herron, Too $hort, Mean Piece, Crystal, P.F.N., Kurupt and Roscoe. The album peaked at number 109 on the Billboard 200, number 15 on the Top R&B/Hip-Hop Albums and number 9 on the Independent Albums in the United States.

Track listing

Notes
Track 12 consists of three separate songs: "Outro - D.P.G.C. 4 Life", "Gangsta Prerogative" featuring uncredited vocals from Kurupt and Roscoe, and "Think About It/Where Ya Headed?" featuring uncredited vocals from Kurupt, where the latter two songs are hidden tracks
Track 13 is a hidden track

Charts

References

External links

2002 albums
Daz Dillinger albums
D.P.G. Recordz albums
Albums produced by Daz Dillinger
Albums produced by Mike Dean (record producer)